Bazaar of Kashan ( Bāzār-e Kāshān) is an old bazaar in the center of the city of Kashan, Iran. It is thought to have been built in the Seljuk era with renovations during the Safavid period.

The bazaar has a famous architecture, especially at its Timche-ye Amin od-Dowleh section, where a grand light well was built in the 19th century. The bazaar is still in use and is a few miles in total length. In the bazaar's complex beside the main bazaars, there are several mosques, tombs, plazas, arcades, baths, and water reservoirs that each were constructed in a different period.

See also

Iranian architecture
List of historical Iranian architects
History of Persian domes

Buildings and structures completed in the 13th century
Architecture in Iran
Buildings and structures in Kashan
Kashan
Tourist attractions in Kashan